The Battle of Kolding (Slaget ved Kolding) on January 9, 1644 was the opening engagement of the Torstenson War between the Swedish Empire and Denmark-Norway. The battle was primarily a cavalry engagement between Swedish and Danish cavalry near the Danish seaport of Kolding. The encounter was part of the wider Thirty Years' War, which saw heavy fighting in Central Europe. The Danish army made a defensive stand only to be overrun by the advancing Swedes. It was a decisive victory for the Swedish forces and by the end of January the Jutland peninsula was a Swedish possession.

Background

Relations between the Swedish Empire and Denmark-Norway had always been poor, but worsened in the 17th century. Since 1630, the Swedes had been at war with various German states in the Thirty Years War. Denmark-Norway had been involved in the war but had left the conflict in 1629. At that time the Dano-Norwegian government had been open to a Swedish intervention in the conflict, but as the Swedish army won victory after victory the Dano-Norwegians became increasingly concerned and antagonistic towards the Swedish Empire. In 1643, the Swedish government under Chancellor Axel Oxenstierna decided that Denmark-Norway was in a vulnerable position, and the Swedish Empire could benefit from declaring war on them. In December 1643, Swedish troops moved into the Jutland peninsula, advancing afterwards into the then Danish territories of Halland and Blekinge. The Dano-Norwegians and their King Christian IV were completely unprepared for the war. Despite this fact, Christian IV ordered the Danish army and navy to mobilize to face the Swedish threat.

Battle

At the town of Kolding in eastern Jutland, Swedish and Danish cavalry clashed in an engagement. The goal of the Danish cavalry was to harass the Swedish forces in the Jutland peninsula. The Swedish cavalry were led by Lieutenant General Robert Douglas. The Danish cavalry were led by Frederik von Buchwald, who belonged to a noble family that owned a great deal of land in the Jutland peninsula. Von Buchwald had 6000 cavalrymen under his command, but the Dano-Norwegian army had been greatly unprepared for the war and it was many years since they had engaged in a conflict. The Swedish cavalry, on the other hand, were experienced veterans of the Thirty Year's War. The Swedish cavalry outnumbered the Danish force, and the battle lasted quite a short time. The Swedish force charged towards the Dano-Norwegian forces and engaged them in horse to horse combat. After some heavy fighting, the Dano-Norwegian cavalry began to rout and retreated from the battlefield, leaving the Swedes the victor.

Aftermath
The Dano-Norwegian force fled north to Snoghøj. There, the Dano-Norwegians capitulated on January 11. The city of Kolding was pillaged by the Swedes and the road north was open. The battle was, as mentioned, mainly a cavalry battle so most of the Dano-Norwegian soldiers escaped without injury and the casualties on both side were quite small.

References

Other Sources 
Guthrie, William P. (2003) The Later Thirty Years War: From the Battle of Wittstock to the Treaty of Westphalia ( Praeger Publishers)

Related reading
Sundberg, Ulf (1998) Swedish Wars, 1521-1814  (Stockholm : Hjalmarson & Högberg) 
Stiles, Andrina  (1992) Sweden and the Baltic, 1523–1721 (Hodder & Stoughton) 1992 
Lisk, Jill  (1967) The Struggle for Supremacy in the Baltic: 1600–1725  (New York City: Funk & Wagnalls)
Frost,  Robert I. (2000) The Northern Wars, 1558–1721   (Longman: Harlow  Publication)    

Battles involving Denmark
Battles involving Sweden
Battles of the Thirty Years' War
Battles of the Torstenson War